SNCF Class Z 5300 are three and four car Electric Multiple Unit type for Paris commuter and regional services. They were built by Carel et Fouche, /Francorail, Fives-Lille and OC Oerlikon between 1965-1968 (1st batch) and 1972-1975 (2nd batch). Many of these trains have been withdrawn starting from 2003.

Characteristics 
These stainless steel-bodied EMUs were built as 4-car units including a driving motor car, two intermediate trailers and a driving trailer. However, some units were shortened to three or two cars by removing one or both of the intermediate trailers. Up to three elements can be coupled together to form a 12-car trainset. The power supply is 1500 V DC with electromechanical traction equipment.

Livery 
As the use of stainless steel eliminates the need for painting; the units are silver, with originally only an orange stripe between the headlights. They are therefore nicknamed petit gris (i.e. "little gray", but also the name of a snail), couscoussière, "silver arrow" or "tin can". However, as some units were modified, the doors were painted red, light blue or dark blue according to the services they were intended for. 

Since 2011, only red-doored units subsist; red doors mean that the unit is fitted with EAS (exploitation à agent seul, i.e. "single crew operation"), and may be operated without a guard.

Operation

Current (Discontinued in 2018) 
As of 2015, Z 5300s are operating on two commuter services in the south-east of Paris:
Melun-Juvisy (RER D), and
Melun-Montereau through Héricy (Transilien, R line).

Discontinued 
This class used to operate on many other services, but has been replaced by more recent stock. Such services include:
Paris-Lyon-Montereau,
Paris-Lyon-Montargis,
Paris-Montparnasse-Rambouillet,
Paris-Montparnasse-Plaisir-Grignon,
Commuter services on the southern part of RER C,
Paris-Montparnasse-Chartres,
Paris-Montparnasse-Le Mans,
Paris-Austerlitz-Orléans,
Shuttle services between Orléans and Les Aubrais (connection with mainline services) with 3-car elements,
Shuttle services between Tours and Saint Pierre des Corps on the same principle.

Accidents 
 On December 24, 1987, a Z 5300 train was involved in a collision in Issy-les-Moulineaux.
 On June 27, 1988, two Z 5300 trains collided head-on at the Gare de Lyon station in Paris. The accident left 56 dead, 57 injured, and resulted in the third deadliest peacetime rail disaster in France.

Gallery

References

Haydock, David; Fox, Peter [1999]. European Handbook No. 4 French Railways Locomotives & Multiple Units, Third Edition, Sheffield, UK: Platform 5 Publishing Ltd.. .

Electric multiple units of France
Z 05300

1500 V DC multiple units of France